Nezamabad (also Romanized as Nez̧āmābād; also known as Nizāmābād) is a village in Khonjesht Rural District, in the Central District of Eqlid County, Fars Province, Iran. At the 2006 census, its population was 1,275, in 267 families.

References 

Populated places in Eqlid County